Abdul Rahim may refer to:

Abdul Rahim (name), containing a list of people with this name.
Abdul Rahim (Afghan politician), Afghan Communications Minister of the Afghan Interim Administration
Abdul Rahim (Indian politician) (1902–1977), Indian politician of the Indian National Congress
Abdul Rahim (athlete) (born 1913), Afghanistan athlete

See also
Abdol Rahim, a village in Hamadan Province, Iran